Benjamin Thomas Caffyn (February 10, 1879 – November 22, 1942) was a Major League Baseball outfielder who played for one season. He played for the Cleveland Naps from August 21, 1906, to October 7, 1906.

External links

1879 births
1942 deaths
Sportspeople from Peoria, Illinois
Cleveland Naps players
Major League Baseball outfielders
Bloomington Blues players
Joliet Standards players
Springfield Foot Trackers players
Springfield Hustlers players
Des Moines Underwriters players
Des Moines Champs players
Akron Champs players
Toronto Maple Leafs (International League) players
Trenton Tigers players
Peoria Distillers players
Vernon Tigers players
Keokuk Indians players
Baseball players from Illinois